James M. Oakley (June 19, 1839 in New York City – March 25, 1887 in Jamaica, Queens County, New York) was an American politician from New York.

Life 
He attended the public schools, and then engaged in the real estate business.

He was a member of the New York State Assembly (Queens Co., 2nd D.) in 1871, 1872, 1873, 1874 and 1875.

He was a delegate to the 1872 and 1876 Democratic National Conventions. In 1877, he was appointed by Gov. Lucius Robinson as Commissioner of Quarantine.

He was a member of the New York State Senate (1st D.) in 1878 and 1879.

He was President of the New York, Woodhaven and Rockaway Railroad from 1881 until his death.

He died at his home in Jamaica, Queens, on March 25, 1887, of "paralysis of the heart," and was buried at the Prospect Cemetery in Queens.

Sources 
 Civil List and Constitutional History of the Colony and State of New York compiled by Edgar Albert Werner (1884; pg. 290 and 372ff)
 The State Government for 1879 by Charles G. Shanks (Weed, Parsons & Co, Albany NY, 1879; pg. 47)
 OBITUARY NOTES; Ex-State Senator James M. Oakley died... in NYT on March 26, 1887 
 EX-SENATOR OAKLEY'S FUNERAL in NYT on March 29, 1887

1839 births
1887 deaths
Democratic Party New York (state) state senators
People from Queens, New York
Democratic Party members of the New York State Assembly
19th-century American railroad executives
19th-century American politicians